Viktor Stanley Lockwood (born 29 March 1992) is a French field hockey player who plays as a defender for Lille and the French national team.

Club career
Lockwood started playing hockey when he was eight years old for Rochin. He then played for Lille until 2014 when he joined the Waterloo Ducks in Belgium. After two seasons he left them for Leuven. He then played only one season for Leuven to join Gantoise in 2017. In 2018 he signed for Orée. After a decision from the club he had to leave Orée after the 2019–20 season. On 14 July it was announced he would return to Lille.

International career
Lockwood was a part of the France under-21 squad which won the silver medal at the 2013 Junior World Cup. He represented France at the 2018 World Cup.

References

External links

1992 births
Living people
French male field hockey players
Male field hockey defenders
2018 Men's Hockey World Cup players
Men's Belgian Hockey League players
Waterloo Ducks H.C. players
KHC Leuven players
Place of birth missing (living people)
2023 Men's FIH Hockey World Cup players